Paravola (Greek: Παραβόλα) is a village and a former municipality in Aetolia-Acarnania, West Greece, Greece. Since the 2011 local government reform it is part of the municipality Agrinio, of which it is a municipal unit. The municipal unit has an area of 135.373 km2. Population 3,773 (2011).

References

External links
Municipality of Paravola 

Populated places in Aetolia-Acarnania